Navegacion y Servicios Aéreos Canarios, better known by its initialism NAYSA, was a regional airline based in Las Palmas, Gran Canaria, Spain. It operated scheduled and charter flights, as well as cargo flights, air taxis, air ambulance flights and crew transfers. Its main base was Gran Canaria International Airport. 

All NAYSA aircraft were operated under a franchise agreement as Binter Canarias into which it has been merged in spring 2018.

History 
The airline was founded by Alfonso Carrero, it was established and started operations on 7 May 1969 at Córdoba as NAYSA (Navegacion y Servicios Aéreos) and added Canarias to the title when operations in the Canary Islands were started in 1973. The fleet consisted originally of a Lear 35,  four Piper Navajo Chieftain, a Piper Aztec, a Piper Cherokee and a PA-18. This company was credited by being one of the first Third Level or Commuter Airlines in Europe. It established the first regular services between the Canary Islands and the Spanish Sahara and linked Madrid Barajas with smaller airports throughout Spain. On 1975 Spain lost the Spanish Sahara and several Government subsidised contracts were lost.  The company changed owners in 1977 and transferred its headquarters to Las Palmas. It is owned by Canarias de Aviación (75%) and Serair (25%) and has 28 employees as of March 2007.

In spring 2018, Binter decided to merge NAYSA into its own operations and therefore handed back NAYSA's air operator certificate. Since then, all former NAYSA operations are part of Binter's.

Destinations

NAYSA operated the following services as of July 2010:

Portugal
Madeira - Madeira Airport

Spain
El Hierro - El Hierro Airport
Fuerteventura - Fuerteventura Airport
Gran Canaria - Gran Canaria Airport Hub
La Gomera - La Gomera Airport
La Palma - La Palma Airport 
Lanzarote - Lanzarote Airport
Mallorca - Palma de Mallorca Airport
Tenerife
Tenerife North Airport Hub
Tenerife South Airport

Fleet 
The NAYSA fleet consisted of the following aircraft as of January 2012 which all were operated for Binter Canarias:

 3 ATR 72-212
 8 ATR 72-212A

References

External links 

Official website

Defunct airlines of Spain
Airlines established in 1973
Airlines disestablished in 2018
Spanish companies established in 1973
Spanish companies disestablished in 2018